Ludmila Richterová was the defending champion but did not compete that year.

Dominique Van Roost won in the final 6–4, 6–2 against Laurence Courtois.

Seeds
A champion seed is indicated in bold text while text in italics indicates the round in which that seed was eliminated.

  Sabine Appelmans (first round)
  Mariaan de Swardt (quarterfinals)
  Miriam Oremans (quarterfinals)
  Laurence Courtois (final)
  Dominique Van Roost (champion)
  Naoko Kijimuta (quarterfinals)
  Patricia Hy-Boulais (semifinals)
  Alexandra Fusai (quarterfinals)

Draw

External links
 1996 Rover British Clay Court Championships Draw

British Hard Court Championships
1996 WTA Tour
1996 in Welsh women's sport